Luke Lea may refer to:

 Luke Lea (American politician, born 1783), U.S. Representative from Tennessee, 1833–1837
 Luke Lea (American politician, born 1879), U.S. Senator from Tennessee, 1911–1917; founder of The Tennessean newspaper
 Luke Lea, Commissioner of Indian Affairs 1850-1853